Thullium(III) fluoride is an inorganic compound with the chemical formula TmF3.

Production 
It can be produced by reacting thulium(III) sulfide and hydrofluoric acid, followed by thermal decomposition:

 3 Tm2S3 + 20 HF + (2 + 2x)H2O → 2 (H3O)Tm3F10·xH2O↓ + 9 H2S↑ (x=1.7)
 (H3O)Tm3F10 → 3 TmF3 + HF↑ + H2O↑

Thulium(III) oxide reacts with fluorinating agents such as hydrogen fluoride, nitrogen trifluoride xenon difluoride to create thullium(III) fluoride as well, although the reaction with nitrogen trifluoride is incomplete and produces a mixture of TmOF and TmF3.

References

External links
Does Boiling Water Remove Fluoride?

Thulium compounds
Fluorides
Lanthanide halides